Chromodoris alternata is a species of colourful sea slug, a dorid nudibranch, a marine gastropod mollusc in the family Chromodorididae.

Distribution

This chromodorid nudibranch is known only from Southern Australia.

References

Chromodorididae
Gastropods described in 1957
Endemic fauna of Australia
Gastropods of Australia